Ship Yard is a rail yard on the Richmond District in Richmond, Virginia.  It is just east of Triple Crossing.  Ship Yard is not often used for putting together trains, but is more for storing empty cars, especially boxcars.

Transportation in Richmond, Virginia